Juma Gul (born 10 November 1999) is an Afghan cricketer. He made his Twenty20 debut for Boost Defenders in the 2017 Shpageeza Cricket League on 11 September 2017. He made his first-class debut for Amo Region in the 2017–18 Ahmad Shah Abdali 4-day Tournament on 20 October 2017.

References

External links
 

1999 births
Living people
Afghan cricketers
Place of birth missing (living people)
Amo Sharks cricketers